In molecular biology mir-657 microRNA is a short RNA molecule. MicroRNAs function to regulate the expression levels of other genes by several mechanisms.

See also 
 MicroRNA

References

Further reading

External links 
 

MicroRNA
MicroRNA precursor families